Kaoruko (written: 馨子 or カオルコ in katakana) is a feminine Japanese given name. Notable people with the name include:

, Japanese empress consort
, Japanese writer

Fictional characters
, a character in the manga series Comic Girls
Kaoruko Awata (泡田 薫子), a character in the manga/anime series My Hero Academia
Kaoruko Hanayagi (花柳 香子), a character in the Revue Starlight franchise

Japanese feminine given names